Byron High School is a public high school located in Byron, Michigan.  The school educates about 390 students in grades 9 to 12 and is part of Byron Area Schools.

Byron's mascot is the eagle.

Notable alumni
Erik Jones, NASCAR driver #20 Joe Gibbs

References

Public high schools in Michigan
Schools in Shiawassee County, Michigan